The 2009–10 Primera Divisió was the fifteenth season of top-tier football in Andorra. It began in September 2009 and ended in May 2010. UE Sant Julià were the defending champions.  FC Santa Coloma won the league championship and entered the first qualifying round of the 2010–11 UEFA Champions League, where they were defeated by Maltese side Birkirkara F.C.  UE Engordany was relegated and will be replaced by Segona Divisió champions Casa Estrella del Benfica for the 2010–11 season.

Competition format
The participating teams first play a conventional round-robin schedule with every team playing each opponent once home and once away for a total of 14 games. The league will then be split up in two groups of four teams with each of them playing teams within their group, a home-and-away cycle of games. The top four teams compete for the championship. The bottom four clubs play out one direct relegation spot and one relegation play-off spot. Records earned in the First Round will be taken over to the respective Second Rounds.

Promotion and relegation from 2008–09
FC Ranger's were relegated after last season due to finishing in 8th place. They were replaced by Segona Divisió champions FC Encamp.

Inter Club d'Escaldes and Segona Divisió runners-up Atletic Club d'Escaldes played a two-legged relegation play-off. Inter kept their spot in Primera Divisió by winning 10–9 on penalties after an aggregated 3–3 tie with their village rivals.

Stadia and locations

First round

League table

Results

Second round

Championship Round

Relegation Round

Relegation playoffs
Encamp, who finished seventh in the league, competed in a two-legged relegation playoff against Extremenya, who finished third in the Segona Divisió (promotion-ineligible Lusitanos B finished second), for one spot in 2010–11 Primera Divisió. Encamp won the playoff, 5 – 2 on aggregate, thus keeping their place in Primera Divisió.

Top goalscorers
Including matches played on 11 October 2009; Source: Soccerway

4 goals
  Luis Miguel Dos Reis (FC Lusitanos)
  Pedro Miguel Reis (FC Lusitanos)

3 goals
  Marcelo Iguacel (CE Principat)
  Gabi Riera (UE Sant Julià)
  Norberto Urbani (FC Santa Coloma)

2 goals
  Víctor Bernat (UE Santa Coloma)
  Luis Miguel (UE Santa Coloma)
  Daniel Mejias (UE Sant Julià)

External links
 Official site 

Primera Divisió seasons
Andorra
1